Martín Cárdenas may refer to:

Martín Cárdenas (motorcyclist) (born 1982), Colombian motorcyclist
Martín Cárdenas (botanist) (1899–1973), Bolivian botanist